The S90 class of torpedo boats was a group of large torpedo boats built for the German Imperial Navy (Kaiserliche Marine) in the early 20th century. They were Hochsee-Torpedoboot ("High seas torpedo boat") built to varying designs by Schichau at Elbing (36 vessels) and Germaniawerft at Kiel (12 vessels). German torpedo boats were designated by shipbuilder, with the first letter of their designation reflecting their builder.

Design

General characteristics and machinery

These 48 vessels were built to ten different designs over the period 1898 to 1907. Thus they varied in dimensions, and they gradually increased in size as more vessels were built. The hull for each boat was divided into eleven watertight compartments, though after , a twelfth compartment was added. They had a crew of two officers and fifty-five enlisted men, though some of the boats had larger crews;  had four more sailors, while G132 had twelve more men, and  had a crew of three officers and 78 enlisted. When serving as half-flotilla flagships, the boats would have a flotilla leader's staff of four officers and eleven enlisted men in addition to the standard crew. The vessels carried a yawl and a dinghy apiece.

The S90-class boats were propelled by a pair of vertical, 3-cylinder triple expansion steam engines that drove a pair of three-bladed screw propellers. Steam was provided by three coal-fired water-tube boilers. Each vessel was equipped with one or two  110-Volt generators for electrical power. Steering was controlled with a pair of rudders, one at the stern and the other in the bow.

Armament
Most of the ships of the class were armed with a main battery of three  SK L/40 guns in single pivot mounts. Many of the boats were rearmed throughout their time in service, trading their 5 cm or 5.2 cm guns for the more powerful 8.8 cm guns. All ships of the class carried three  deck-mounted single torpedo tubes with five torpedoes.

Ships in class

Service history
Most of the ships served into World War 1. Four of these boats took part in the Battle off Texel on the exact same day, in which a British light cruiser and four destroyers destroyed the Seventh Half-Flotilla consisting of S119, S115, S117 and S118.

Footnotes

References
 

Torpedo boats of the Imperial German Navy
World War I torpedo boats of Germany